The O'Sullivan Ladies Open was a golf tournament on the LPGA Tour from 1968 to 1971. It was played at the Winchester Country Club in Winchester, Virginia.

Winners
O'Sullivan Ladies Open
1971 Judy Kimball
1970 Shirley Englehorn
1969 Murle Lindstrom

O'Sullivan Open
1968 Marilynn Smith

References

Former LPGA Tour events
Golf in Virginia
Recurring sporting events established in 1968
Recurring events disestablished in 1971
1968 establishments in Virginia
1971 disestablishments in Virginia
History of women in Virginia